Bloomfield is an unincorporated community in Johnson County, Illinois, United States.

References

Unincorporated communities in Johnson County, Illinois
Unincorporated communities in Illinois